The Hearinga Suite is an album by Muhal Richard Abrams released on the Italian Black Saint label in 1989 and features performances of seven of Abrams compositions by an eighteen-member orchestra. Abrams dedicated the music on the album to Steve McCall and Donald Raphael Garrett.

Reception
The Allmusic review by Scott Yanow awarded the album 4½ stars stating "Pianist Muhal Richard Abrams leads an 18-piece orchestra on his seven originals that make up the Hearinga Suite. Much of the music is quite adventurous, although "Oldfotalk" is fairly conventional. Although the personnel includes such fine players as trumpeters Jack Walrath and Cecil Bridgewater and saxophonists John Purcell and Marty Ehrlich, the emphasis is on group interplay and the colorful arrangements. Throughout this very interesting set, Abrams shows how a big band can logically be utilized in freer forms of jazz. ".  The Penguin Guide to Jazz awarded the album 3½ stars stating "This marks something of a quantum shift, a move towards something larger and more cohesive. The spirit of Ellington is not far away here".

Track listing
All compositions by Muhal Richard Abrams
 "Hearinga" - 5:11
 "Conversations With the Three of Me" - 5:45
 "Seesall" - 5:28
 "Aura of Thought- Things" - 4:36
 "Oldfotalk" - 6:43
 "Finditnow" - 6:27
 "Bermix" - 6:55 
Recorded January 17 & 18, 1989 at A & R Recording Studios, New York City

Personnel
Ron Tooley - trumpet
Jack Walrath - trumpet
Cecil Bridgewater - trumpet
Frank Gordon - trumpet
Clifton Anderson - trombone
Dick Griffin - trombone
Jack Jeffers - bass trombone
Bill Lowe - bass trombone
John Purcell - flute, clarinet, tenor saxophone
Marty Ehrlich - piccolo, flute, clarinet, alto saxophone
Patience Higgins - bass clarinet, tenor saxophone
Courtnay Winter - bassoon, bass clarinet, tenor saxophone
Charles Davis - baritone saxophone, soprano saxophone
Diedre Murray - cello
Fred Hopkins - bass
Warren Smith - glockenspiel, vibes, percussion
Andrew Cyrille - drums
Muhal Richard Abrams - piano, synthesizer, conductor

References

1989 albums
Muhal Richard Abrams albums
Black Saint/Soul Note albums